Alexander Satschko and Simon Stadler were the defending champions but only Satschko chose to defend his title, partnering Gero Kretschmer. Satschko lost in the quarterfinals to Sander Gillé and Joran Vliegen.

Gillé and Vliegen won the title after defeating Máximo González and Fabrício Neis 3–6, 6–3, [10–7] in the final.

Seeds

Draw

References
 Main Draw

Internationaux de Tennis de BLOIS - Doubles
2017 Doubles